Safar Zehi (also Romanized as Şafar Zehī; also known as Şafar Zā’ī, Separze‘ī, and Separze’t) is a village in Pir Sohrab Rural District, in the Central District of Chabahar County, Sistan and Baluchestan Province, Iran. At the 2006 census, its population was 548, in 98 families.

References 

Populated places in Chabahar County